Nizhegorodsky City District is a central administrative district (raion) in Upper City of Nizhny Novgorod, Russia. The main strategic, historical, political and cultural district of the city.

Centre of district is popular among tourists. Here is the Kremlin, the Minin and Pozharsky Square, Bolshaya Pokrovskaya Street, Rozhdestvenskaya Street, the monument to Minin and Pozharsky and other landmarks.

In the central part of the district are the main political institutions. It is strategically important.

References 

 
City districts of Nizhny Novgorod